Epermeniidae or the fringe-tufted moths is a family of insects in the lepidopteran order with about 14 genera. Previously they have been divided in two subfamilies Epermeniinae and Ochromolopinae (e.g. Common, 1990: 321) but this is no longer maintained since the last group is probably hierarchically nested within the first (Dugdale et al., 1999). They are presently placed in their own superfamily but have previously been placed among the Yponomeutoidea or Copromorphoidea with which they share some features. Their systematic placement among the apoditrysian group "Obtectomera" (having pupal segments I-IV immobile) is however uncertain. They show some morphological similarities to the "plume moths" (Alucitoidea and Pterophoroidea), for example the wing fringe has similar groups of scales (Dugdale et al., 1999). There are also some similarities to Schreckensteinioidea, for example spiny legs and at least in some species an open-network cocoon. The genus Thambotricha from New Zealand may be the sister group of all other extant members. The most important genera are Epermenia, Ochromolopis and Gnathifera. The group has been extensively revised and catalogued by Dr Reinhard Gaedike (e.g. Gaedike, 1977, 1979).

Identification
Epermeniidae are small narrow-winged moths, having a span of 7–20 mm, with conspicuous whorls of bristles on their legs, lacking spines on the abdomen unlike some similar moths. The smoothly scaled head bears no ocelli or "chaetosemata". They are most easily confused with Stathmopodinae (Oecophoridae), which unlike epermeniids have the tarsi of the forelegs and midlegs without the whorls of spines, and whose proboscis is scaled at the base. The projecting scale tufts on the inner margin of the hindwing is the easiest field character (Common, 1990).

Distribution
Epermeniidae occur worldwide in both temperate and tropical regions and especially in montane areas, but are sparsely known from the Afrotropics. Gnathifera occurs from Australia to New Caledonia; Epermenia ranges from the Palaearctic to Indo-Australia and the Pacific islands.

Behaviour
Epermeniidae are nocturnal as adults and well-camouflaged. They rest parallel to the surface with their wings held over their back in a tent-like manner (Robinson et al., 1994).

Biology
The caterpillars feed inside almost any plant parts (fruits, seeds, galls, leaves or flowers), sometimes in a mine or sometimes exposed or under silk on the leaf surface; unlike some Lepidoptera the pupa is not extruded from the cocoon, and may be found in its fine open-network cocoon on the plant or amongst debris on the ground.

Host plants
Many species in Europe feed on umbels of Apiaceae, and Epermenia chaerophyllella is a pest of cultivated species. Other species feed on the parasitic plant families Santalaceae (e.g. the Australian quandong moth) and Loranthaceae, or on Pinaceae, Pittosporaceae and Leguminosae.

Systematics
Africepermenia Gaedike, 2004
Agiton Turner, 1926
Epermenia Hübner, 1825
=Acanthedra Meyrick, 1917
=Calotripis Hübner, 1825
=Chauliodus Treitschke, 1833
=Epermeniola Gaedike, 1968
=Lophonotus Stephens, 1829
=Tichotripis Hübner, 1825
=Epimarptis Meyrick, 1914
=Temeluchella T. B. Fletcher, 1940
=Temelucha Meyrick, 1909
=Cataplectica Walsingham, 1894
=Heydenia Hofmann, 1868
Gnathifera Gaedike, 1978
Inuncus Gaedike, 2013
Lasiostega Meyrick, 1932
Mesepermenia Gaedike, 2004
Notodryas Meyrick, 1897
Ochromolopis Hübner, 1825
Parochromolopis Gaedike, 1977
Paraepermenia Gaedike, 1968
Phaulernis Meyrick, 1895
Picrodoxa Meyrick, 1923
Sinicaepermenia Heppner, 1990
Thambotricha Meyrick, 1922

References

Common, I.F.B. (1990). Moths of Australia. Brill Academic Publishers, Leiden. 535 pages.
Dugdale, J.S., Kristensen, N.P., Robinson, G.S. and Scoble, M.J. (1999) [1998]. "The smaller microlepidoptera grade superfamilies",  Ch.13., pp. 217–232 in Kristensen, N.P. (Ed.). Lepidoptera, Moths and Butterflies. Volume 1: Evolution, Systematics, and Biogeography. Handbuch der Zoologie. Eine Naturgeschichte der Stämme des Tierreiches / Handbook of Zoology. A Natural History of the phyla of the Animal Kingdom. Band / Volume IV Arthropoda: Insecta Teilband / Part 35: 491 pp. Walter de Gruyter, Berlin, New York.
Gaedike, R. (1977). "Revision der nearktischen und neotropischen Epermeniidae (Lepidoptera)". Beiträge zur Entomologia, 27(2): 301-312.
Gaedike, R. (1979). "Katalog der Epermeniidae der Welt (Lepidoptera)". Beiträge zur Entomologia, 29: 201-209.
Holloway, J.D., Kibby, G and Peggie, D. (1997). The families of Malesian moths and butterflies. Fauna Malesia Handbooks. 455 pp. Brill Academic Publishers, Leiden.
Robinson, G.S., Tuck, K.R., Shaffer, M. and Cook, K. (1994). The smaller moths of South-East Asia. Malaysian Nature Society, Kuala Lumpur.

Sources
Firefly Encyclopedia of Insects and Spiders, edited by Christopher O'Toole, 2002

External links
Tufts at UKMoths
Tree of Life
Images at British Leafminers
Epermeniidae at UKMoths
Epermeniidae at Insects of Britain and Ireland: the families of Lepidoptera
Finnish species at Microlepidoptera of Finland - an Overview

 
Moth families